Whitby West Cliff railway station was a railway station on the Whitby Redcar and Middlesbrough Union Railway. It was opened on 3 December 1883, to serve the West Cliff area of the town of Whitby, North Yorkshire, England.

West Cliff closed on 12 June 1961 meaning trains from Scarborough had to reverse at Prospect Hill Junction to go to Whitby Town.

History
The station was opened in December 1883, when the extension from  opened southwards towards Whitby. South of the station, an incline allowed trains to descend to the railway station in Whitby town. In July 1885, a second line from the south was opened which spanned the River Esk over Larpool Viaduct. This line was the Scarborough and Whitby Railway and meant that trains for Whitby from Scarborough, had to reverse at West Cliff station to enable them to terminate in Whitby Town railway station. This procedure continued until 1961, when the trains reversed at Prospect Hill Junction.

It originally had nameboards that displayed  West Cliff only.

From West Cliff to Prospect Hill was a downhill gradient of 1-in-60, and from Prospect Hill to Bog Hall was 1-in-52.

Although the station was built with a goods yard (at the north eastern end of the southbound platform), most goods traffic was handled at Whitby Town. In the 1950s, the only commodity being handled at West Cliff was coke and coal. The station had two platforms, with a third line on the western side which allowed steam hauled trains to and from Scarborough to run around their trains, though from 1955, shorter trains were propelled up from Whitby Town and left across Larpool viaduct without having to reverse. As some trains from Scarborough and Saltburn went through without reversing down to Whitby Town, a shuttle service was introduced using Sentinel steam railcars. This led to the LNER converting the horse dock at the south end of the station into a third platform.

The line north from West Cliff closed in May 1958 and thereafter, the station was the reversing location for trains between Whitby Town and Scarborough. The station closed completely in June 1961. Services for the Scarborough and Whitby Line reversed at Prospect Hill Junction until closure of that line in 1965.

After closure, the site was used as a storage facility and then as offices for the local water board. The main buildings on the southbound platform were later converted into private dwellings named Beechings Mews. Some writers have pointed out the irony that the station was closed before the Beeching axe.

References

Sources

Further reading

External links

 Whitby West Cliff station (left) on navigable 1955 O. S. map

Whitby
Disused railway stations in the Borough of Scarborough
Former North Eastern Railway (UK) stations
Railway stations in Great Britain opened in 1883
Railway stations in Great Britain closed in 1961